José del Carmen Enríquez Rosado (born 16 July 1947) is a Mexican politician from the Party of the Democratic Revolution. He has served as Deputy of the LIV, LVII and LXI Legislatures of the Mexican Congress representing the State of Mexico.

References

1947 births
Living people
Politicians from the State of Mexico
Party of the Democratic Revolution politicians
20th-century Mexican politicians
Deputies of the LXI Legislature of Mexico
Members of the Chamber of Deputies (Mexico) for the State of Mexico